Filip Petrov (Macedonian: Филип Пeтpoв, born 23 February 1989) is a Macedonian footballer currently playing for Vardar.

Club career
Born in Skopje, Yugoslavia (today North Macedonia), he is the son of former footballer Mirko Petrov. While playing with the youth team of Vardar, Filip Petrov was regarded as one of the most talented youth players.

After playing as senior with FK Vardar since 2007, Filip decided to move abroad and signed with Serbian SuperLiga club FK Javor Ivanjica in January 2010. After playing one and a half seasons with them, he returned in summer 2011 to his former club, Vardar.  At the end of the 2011–12 First Macedonian Football League, beside winning the championship with Vardar, he became the league's top assistant and on 27 July 2012 he was selected for the MPL season best XI by the local football specialised website macedonianfootball.com.

Filip Petrov had played with the Macedonian U-17 and U-19 teams, and since 2009 has been a regular in the Macedonian U-21 team.

Petrov signed with FK Makedonija Gjorče Petrov in May 2018. He then joined FK Borec in January 2019.

Achievements
FK Vardar
Macedonian First Football League: 3
Winner: 2011–12, 2012–13, 2014–15
Macedonian Football Cup: 1
Winner: 2006–07
Macedonian Football Super Cup: 1
Winner: 2013

FK Pelister
Macedonian Football Cup: 1
Winner: 2016–17

References

External source
 Profile at Srbijafudbal
 Filip Petrov Stats at Utakmica.rs
 

1994 births
Living people
Footballers from Skopje
Association football forwards
Macedonian footballers
North Macedonia under-21 international footballers
North Macedonia youth international footballers
FK Vardar players
FK Javor Ivanjica players
FK Teteks players
FK Pelister players
FK Makedonija Gjorče Petrov players
FK Borec players
Macedonian First Football League players
Serbian SuperLiga players
Macedonian expatriate footballers
Expatriate footballers in Serbia
Macedonian expatriate sportspeople in Serbia